John Fletcher Ream (16 September 1854 – 26 February 1927) was an American politician.

Ream was born on 16 September 1854 in New Castle, Pennsylvania. His mother was of English descent, and his father was of German descent. The Ream family moved to Mahaska County, Iowa in May 1855. At the age of sixteen, John Ream began working in the coal mines of Beacon, Iowa. Between 1898 and 1900, Ream was president of the Iowa District of the United Mine Workers union. He also served a three year-term on the national executive board of the union, representing the state of Iowa. Prior to seeking statewide political office, Ream served on the Beacon school board for nine years, was mayor of the town, as well as justice of the peace. He was elected to the Iowa Senate in 1908 and 1912 to represent District 14, which included Mahaska County at the time. He was the first Democratic Party candidate from Mahaska County to be elected a state senator since the American Civil War ended. Ream's electoral victory in 1908 was unsuccessfully challenged by Albert F. N. Hambleton. Ream stepped down at the end of his second term in 1917, and died at Mercy Hospital in Oskaloosa on 26 February 1927.

References

1854 births
School board members in Iowa
Mayors of places in Iowa
Trade unionists from Iowa
American trade union leaders
1927 deaths
People from Oskaloosa, Iowa
Democratic Party Iowa state senators
American justices of the peace
United Mine Workers people
American people of English descent
People from New Castle, Pennsylvania
American coal miners
American people of German descent